Aleksandr Nikolayevich Dorofeyev (born June 3, 1957) is a Russian professional football coach and a former player  currently managing FC Irtysh Omsk in the Russian Second Division.

Dorofeyev played in the Russian First League with FC Dynamo Barnaul and FC Sakhalin Kholmsk.

External links
Profile at Footballfacts.ru

1957 births
Living people
Soviet footballers
Russian footballers
FC Dynamo Barnaul players
Russian football managers
Association football defenders